"Told You So" is a 2013 single by the Danish singer Christopher (full name Christopher Nissen). It was released on Parlophone Danmark and is the title track of his same tilted album Told You So and pre-released in September 2013 in preparation for the release of the same-tilted album due 24 March 2014. The music video reminiscent of Michael Jackson The way you make me feel

The single was a hit in 2013 reaching number 4 on the Danish Trackisten official Danish Singles charts and had a comeback in March and April 2014 with the release of the album and rising yet again to number 5 on Tracklisten.

Charts

References

2013 songs
Christopher (singer) songs
2013 singles
Warner Music Group singles
Parlophone singles
Songs written by Brandon Beal